Aq Tappeh (also Romanized as Āq Tappeh and Āq Tepe; also known as Āq Tappeh-ye Nashr) is a village in Gonbad Rural District, in the Central District of Hamadan County, Hamadan Province, Iran. At the 2006 census, its population was 50, in 10 families.

References 

Populated places in Hamadan County